The Ashton-under-Lyne trolleybus system once served the market town of Ashton-under-Lyne, now in the Metropolitan Borough of Tameside, Greater Manchester, north west England.

By the standards of the various now-defunct trolleybus systems in the United Kingdom, it was a small one, with a total of only five routes, and a maximum fleet of 19 trolleybuses.

The Ashton trolleybus system also served the city of Manchester.

Two of the former Ashton system trolleybuses are now preserved.  One of them is at the Greater Manchester Transport Museum in Cheetham, Manchester, and the other one is based at the East Anglia Transport Museum, Carlton Colville, Suffolk.

See also

History of Manchester
Transport in Manchester
List of trolleybus systems in the United Kingdom

References

Notes

Further reading

External links
SCT'61 website - photos and descriptions of Ashton-under-Lyne trolleybuses and early motorbuses
National Trolleybus Archive
British Trolleybus Society, based in Reading
National Trolleybus Association, based in London

Bus transport in Greater Manchester
Ashton-Under-Lyne
Ashton-Under-Lyne
Ashton-under-Lyne
History of transport in Greater Manchester